Andrew O. Jackson (born 1941) is an American plant virologist.

Early life
Born near Enterprise, Alabama in 1941 on his family's farm. While growing up he observed diseases of insect pests, and roamed through the surrounding countryside with small wild animals, giving him early exposure to organisms which would later become his professional interest.

Higher education
Jackson graduated with a Bachelor of Science in botany and plant pathology in 1964 from Oklahoma State University, then a Master of Science in plant pathology in 1967 from the same institution. In 1970, Jackson earned a PhD in plant pathology and microbiology from the University of Manitoba under Drs. D. J. Samborski and Roland Rohringer.

Postdoctoral
Immediately in 1970 he took a postdoctoral position in plant virology at University of Arizona.

Research professor
In 1984 he was recommended by Jack Morris to fill a tenured vacancy at the University of California, Berkeley where Morris was already a professor. Until 1990 they worked together often and become closely associated in their research and publications.

After visiting China in 1998 — Beijing, Hangzhou, and Shanghai — in 2004 Jackson began taking sabbaticals every year for three or four months to China Agricultural University and Zhejiang University as a researcher and lecturer. He continued for the next decade until his retirement in 2014.

Awards
Recipient of the Ruth Allen Award in 2005.

References

Selected authored bibliography

External links
 
 

American phytopathologists
Plant virologists
University of Manitoba alumni
Oklahoma State University alumni
Ruth Allen Award recipients
American virologists
1941 births
Living people